The Northwest Museum of Arts and Culture, formerly the Cheney Cowles Museum and the Pacific Northwest Indian Center, is located in Spokane, Washington's Browne's Addition. It is associated with the Smithsonian Institution, and is accredited by the American Alliance of Museums.

About 

The MAC, as it is colloquially known, also owns and offers tours at the nearby Campbell House, an 1898 house designed by architect Kirtland Cutter, and included on the National Register of Historic Places listings in Spokane County, Washington.

The Northwest Museum of Arts and Culture (MAC) is the largest cultural organization in the Inland Northwest with five underground galleries, café, store, education center, community room and the Center for Plateau Cultural Studies. The MAC campus also includes the historic 1898 Campbell House, library and archives, an auditorium and outdoor amphitheater.  The exhibits and programs focus on three major disciplines: American Indian and other cultures, regional history and visual art.

The Joel E. Ferris Research Library & Archives is open via appointment.

References

External links 

 

Art museums and galleries in Washington (state)
Museums in Spokane County, Washington
Historic house museums in Washington (state)
Native American museums in Washington (state)
History museums in Washington (state)
Buildings and structures in Spokane, Washington
Institutions accredited by the American Alliance of Museums
Kirtland Cutter buildings
Smithsonian Institution affiliates
Tourist attractions in Spokane, Washington
Art museums established in 1916
1916 establishments in Washington (state)